Joseph Gascoigne Nightingale (1695–1752), of Enfield, Middlesex, was a British politician who sat in the House of Commons from  1727 to 1734.

Early life
Nightingale was baptized as Gascoigne on 19 December 1695, the eldest son of Rev. Joseph Gascoigne, vicar of Enfield, and his wife Anne Theobald, daughter of Francis Theobald of Barking, Suffolk and his wife Anne Nightingale, who was the sister of Sir Thomas Nightingale, 2nd Baronet. 

He was educated at Enfield under Dr Uvedale and was admitted at Trinity College, Cambridge on 1 July 1712. 

In  1721 he succeeded his father and in 1722 he succeeded his younger brother Robert to the estates worth nearly £300,000 of Sir Robert Nightingale, 4th Baronet. He thereupon  assumed the additional name of Nightingale. 

He married Lady Elizabeth Shirley, daughter of Washington Shirley, 2nd Earl Ferrers and his wife Mary Levinge, of Chartley, near Stafford on 24 June 1725.

Career
Nightingale was returned as Member of Parliament for Stafford at the 1727 British general election. He voted with the Opposition in every recorded division, He did not stand again at the 1734 British general election.

Later years
Nightingale's wife Elizabeth died on 17 August 1731 following the premature birth of her daughter Elizabeth as a result of the shock caused by a violent flash of lightning. They had  three sons, Washington, Joseph and Robert.

Nightingale  moved to Mamhead house in Devon for respite and recovery. He died on 16 July 1752. Of the sons, only Washington survived him  by only two years. His daughter Elizabeth also survived him and married Wilmot Vaughan, 1st Earl of Lisburne but died, also in childbirth, in 1755. The estates thus passed to the Earls of Lisburne.

Nightingale and his wife are commemorated by a  spectacular monument in Westminster Abbey by the sculptor Louis Francois Roubiliac. It depicts a skeletal Death emerging from his prison to aim a fatal dart at the dying figure of Elizabeth Nightingale while her husband protects her. The two are buried at the Abbey in a nearby vault.

References

1695 births
1752 deaths
Members of the Parliament of Great Britain for Stafford
Alumni of Trinity College, Cambridge
British MPs 1727–1734